Wamogo Regional High School is a public school in Litchfield, Connecticut. It serves grades 9 through 12. It is the public high school for the surrounding towns of Morris, Warren, and Goshen. Additionally, students from the towns of Litchfield, Torrington, Terryville, Plymouth, Harwinton, Burlington, and Thomaston can attend if they apply to the Agriculture Education Program for high school students only. Wamogo Regional Middle School is located in the same facility and serves grades 6 through 8.  

Wamogo was founded in the 1950s. Its name is a portmanteau stemming from the towns Warren, Morris, and Goshen, where the 'Wa' is for Warren, the 'mo' is for Morris, and the 'go' is for Goshen.

Notable people who have attended Wamogo include former NBA star Chuck Aleksinas and flat track motorcycle racer Kenny Coolbeth.

On June 29, 2022, Warren, Morris, Goshen and Litchfield voted to merge their school systems, creating a new Region 20. The Wamogo building will serve as the High School for the new region, when it begins in 2025.

References

Public high schools in Connecticut
Schools in Litchfield County, Connecticut